Bəhrambağ is a village in the municipality of Quşqara in the Goygol Rayon of Azerbaijan.

References

Populated places in Goygol District